Quercus castanea is a species of oak tree. It is widespread across much of Mexico, from Sonora to Chiapas, and in Guatemala, El Salvador, and Honduras.

Description
It flowers from March to June, and its acorns mature between October and December.

The species is known to hybridize with other sympatric red oak species across its range.

Range and habitat
Quercus castanea is native to the mountains of Mexico, Guatemala, El Salvador, and Honduras. In Mexico, the species inhabits the Sierra Madre Oriental, Sierra Madre Occidental, Trans-Mexican Volcanic Belt, Sierra Madre de Oaxaca, and Sierra Madre del Sur between  1,400 and 2,600 meters elevation. It also inhabits the Sierra Madre de Chiapas of Mexico Mexico and Guatemala, and the Montecristo Massif where the borders of El Salvador, Guatemala, and Honduras meet. In Guatemala Q. castanea has been reported up to 3,500 meters elevation. The species' estimated extent of occurrence (EOO) is 1,110,000 km2, based on over 500 collections and herbarium records.

The species is found in a variety of montane habitats. It is common in dry oak forests, xerophytic shrublands, and open oak woodlands alongside cacti and trees of family Leguminaceae. It also grows in humid montane cloud forests. 

In the Cuitzeo Basin of central Mexico, acorn woodpeckers (Melanerpes formicivorus) and golden-fronted woodpeckers (Melanerpes aurifrons) are important acorn dispersers.

References

External links
 photo of herbarium specimen at Missouri Botanical Garden, collected in Oaxaca in 1894

castanea
Oaks of Mexico
Flora of the Sierra Madre Occidental
Flora of the Sierra Madre Oriental
Flora of the Trans-Mexican Volcanic Belt
Flora of the Sierra Madre de Oaxaca
Flora of the Sierra Madre del Sur
Flora of the Central American montane forests
Sierra Madre de Chiapas
Flora of the Chiapas Highlands
Trees of Chiapas
Trees of Michoacán
Trees of Oaxaca
Trees of Puebla
Trees of Veracruz
Trees of Guatemala
Trees of El Salvador
Trees of Honduras
Plants described in 1801